The 1977–78 Yugoslav Ice Hockey League season was the 36th season of the Yugoslav Ice Hockey League, the top level of ice hockey in Yugoslavia. Four teams participated in the league, and Jesenice have won the championship.

Regular season

External links
Season on hrhockey

Yugoslav
Yugoslav Ice Hockey League seasons
1977–78 in Yugoslav ice hockey